Chi vuole essere Fabri fibra is the fifth studio album by Italian rapper Fabri Fibra. It was released on 10 April 2009 by Universal Music Group.

Track listing
Chi vuole essere Fabri Fibra? (featuring Daniele Vit) – 3:57
10 euro in tasca (featuring Supa) – 4:07
Speak English – 3:57
Donna famosa – 4:21
Via vai (featuring Dargen D'Amico) – 4:19
In quel posto – 3:55
Extralarge (featuring Vincenzo da Via Anfossi) – 3:43
In testa (featuring Noyz Narcos) – 3:52
Alla fine di tutto questo – 4:27
Incomprensioni (featuring Federico Zampaglione) – 4:23

Charts

Certifications

References

2009 albums
Fabri Fibra albums